Swedish Church may refer to:

Churches
Church of Sweden
Catholic Church in Sweden
Swedish Evangelical Lutheran Church (disambiguation)
Uniting Church in Sweden (Equmeniakyrkan) initially Joint Future Church made up of the union of:
Baptist Union of Sweden
Mission Covenant Church of Sweden
United Methodist Church of Sweden